Indian Gorkhas also known as Nepali Indians, are Nepali language-speaking Indians. The modern term "Indian Gorkha" is used to differentiate the ethnic Gorkhas from Nepalis.

Indian Gorkhas are citizens of India as per the gazette notification of the Government of India on the issue of citizenship of the Gorkhas from India. The Nepali language is included in the eighth schedule of the Indian Constitution. However, the Indian Gorkhas are faced with a unique identity crisis with regard to their Indian citizenship because of the Indo-Nepal Treaty of Peace and Friendship (1950) that permits "on a reciprocal basis, the nationals of one country in the territories of the other the same privileges in the matter of residence, ownership of property, participation in trade and commerce, movement and other privileges of a similar nature".

Ethnicities and castes
 Indian Gorkhas are considered an Indian indigenous ethnic group found in multiple states in northeastern part of the country with a mixture of castes and ethno-tribe clans. The Gorkhali Parbatiya ethnic groups include the Khas-Parbatiyas such as Bahun (hill Brahmins), Chhetri (Khas), Thakuri, Badi, Kami, Damai, Sarki, Gandarbha, Kumal, etc. Other Tibeto-ethnic groups include Tamang, Gurung, Magar, Newar, Bhujel (Khawas), Sherpa and Thami. The Kirati people include Khambu (Rai), Limbu (Subba), Sunuwar (Mukhiya), Yakkha (Dewan), Dhimal, etc. Although each of them has its own language (belonging to the Tibeto-Burman languages or Indo-Aryan languages), the lingua franca among the Gorkhas is the Nepali language with its script in Devnagari. It is one of the official languages of India.

Population

As per the 2011 Census, a total of 2,926,168 people in India spoke Nepali as their mother tongue. The largest populations can be found in West Bengal – 1,155,375 (+12.97% from 2001 Census), Assam – 596,210 (+5.56%), Sikkim – 382,200 (+12.87%), Uttarakhand – 106,399 (+16.86%), Arunachal Pradesh – 95,317 (+00.42%), Himachal Pradesh – 89,508 (+27.37%), Maharashtra – 75,683 (+19.22%), Manipur – 63,756 (+38.61%), Meghalaya –  54,716 (+4.91%), Nagaland – 43,481 (+27.06%), and Mizoram – 8,994 (+0.51%). Apart from this, there are additional speakers of languages such as Limbu (40,835), Rai (15,644), Sherpa (16,012) and Tamang (20,154). So the combined strength of Nepali and the other four Gorkha languages comes to 3,018,813.

As per the 2001 Census, a total of 2,871,749 people in India spoke Nepali as their mother tongue. The largest populations were in West Bengal – 1,022,725 (+18.87% from 1991 Census), Assam – 564,790 (+30.58%),  Sikkim – 338,606 (+32.05%), Uttarakhand – 355,029 (+255.53%), Arunachal Pradesh – 94,919 (+16.93%), Himachal Pradesh – 70,272 (+50.64%), Maharashtra – 63,480 (+59.69%), Meghalaya –  52,155 (+6.04%), Manipur – 45,998 (−1.08%), Nagaland – 34,222 (+6.04%), and Mizoram – 8,948 (+8.50%). As per the 1991 Census, the number of Nepali speakers in India was 2,076,645.

Arunachal Pradesh
As per the 2001 Census, districts with the largest Nepali populations are West Kameng – 13,580 (18.2% of the total population) Lohit – 22,200 (15.77%), and  Dibang Valley – 15,452 (26.77%). Tehsils with the largest proportion of Nepalis are Koronu (55.35%), Kibithoo (50.68%), Sunpura (42.28%), Vijoynagar (42.13%), and Roing (32.39%).

As per the 2011 Census, districts with the largest Nepali populations are West Kameng – 14,333 (17.1% of the total population) Lohit – 22,988 (13.77%), and Dibang Valley – 14,271 (22.99%). Tehsils with the largest proportion of Nepalis are Koronu (48.49%), Kibithoo (6.5%), Sunpura (34.47%), Vijoynagar (41.8%), and Roing (26.0%).

Assam
During the 1991 Census, the districts with the largest concentrations were Sonitpur – 91,631 (6.43%), Tinsukia – 76,083 (7.91%), and Karbi Anglong – 37,710 (5.69%).

As per the 2001 Census, districts with the largest ethnic Nepali populations are Sonitpur – 131,261 (7.81% of the total population) Tinsukia – 87,850 (7.64%), and Karbi Anglong – 46,871 (5.76%). Tehsils with the largest proportion of Nepalis are Sadiya (27.51%), Na Duar (16.39%), Helem (15.43%), Margherita (13.10%), and Umrangso (12.37%).

As per the 2011 Census, districts with the largest ethnic Nepali populations are Sonitpur – 135,525 (7.04% of the total population) Tinsukia – 99,812 (7.52%), and Karbi Anglong – 51,496 (5.38%). Tehsils with the largest proportion of Nepalis are Sadiya (26.2%), Na Duar (14.88%), Helem (14.35%), Margherita (13.47%), and Umrangso (12.46%).

Manipur
As per the 2011 census, Tehsils with the largest proportion of Nepali people are Sadar Hills West (33.0%), Saitu-Gamphazol (9.54%), and Lamshang (10.85%). Districts with the largest Nepali population are Senapati – 39,039 (8.15%), Imphal West – 10,391 (2.01%) and Imphal East – 6,903 (1.51%).

This is how the previous censuses counted the number of Nepali speakers in Manipur:
1961 Census: 13,571 
1971 Census: 26,381 
1981 Census: 37,046
1991 Census: 46,500
2001 Census: 45,998 (*) 
2011 Census: 63,756

Meghalaya
Gorkha population is mostly concentrated in the districts of East Khasi Hills (37,000 or 4.48%) and Ribhoi (10,524 or 4.07%). Tehsils with the largest concentration include Myliem (8.18%) and Umling (6.72%).

Among the cities, the highest concentration of Nepali speakers can be found in Shillong Cantonment (29.98%), Shillong (9.83%), Pynthorumkhrah (7.02%), Nongmynsong (26.67%), Madanrting (17.83%), and Nongkseh (14.20%).

This is how the previous censuses counted the number of Nepali speakers in Meghalaya:
 1961: 32,288
 1971: 44,445
 1981: 61,259
 1991: 49,186 
 2001: 52,155
 2011: 54,716

Mizoram
As per the 2011 Census, there are a total of 9,035 Gorkhas in Mizoram. Of this, 5,944 are concentrated in Tlangnuam Tehsil of Aizawl district, where they form 1.9% of the population. The Central Gorkha Mandir Committee operates a total of 13 Hindu temples in Mizoram and these are the only Hindu places of worship in the state.

Nagaland
Most of the Nepali speaking population are found in the districts of Dimapur (21,596 or 5.70%) and Kohima (9,812 or 3.66%). Tehsils with the largest concentration are Naginimora (7.48%), Merangmen (6.78%), Niuland (6.48%), Kuhoboto (7.04%), Chümoukedima (7.07%), Dhansiripar (6.09%), Medziphema (9.11%), Namsang (8.81%), Kohima Sadar (6.27%), Sechü-Zubza (5.03%), and Pedi (7.61%).

Sikkim
The state of Sikkim is the only state in India with a majority ethnic Nepali population. The Sikkim census of 2011 found that Sikkim was the least populated state of India. Sikkim's population according to the 2011 Census was 610,577, and has grown by approximately 100,000 since the last census. The Nepali/Gorkhali language is the lingua franca of Sikkim, while Tibetan (Bhutia) and Lepcha are spoken in certain areas. As per the 2011 Census, there were a total of 453,819 speakers of various Tibetan languages (Nepali – 382,200, Limbu – 38,733, Sherpa – 13,681, Tamang – 11,734 and Rai – 7,471). Out of this, 20.14% (91,399) were Tibetan Limbu/Tamang, 6.23% (28,275) were Dalit and 73.63% were General category.

According to the census, there are a total of 53,703 Limbu and 37,696 Tamang in Sikkim, of whom a majority speak the Nepali language as their mother tongue. Also, small numbers of Bhotia and Lepcha also speak the Nepali language as their mother tongue. As per the 2011 Census, there were a total of 69,598 Bhotia in Sikkim (including Sherpa, Tamang, Gurung and Tibetan. etc), but only 58,355 were speaking languages such as Sikkimese and Sherpa. Out of the 42,909 Lepcha there were only 38,313 speakers for the Lepcha language.

Uttarakhand
As per the 2011 census, the total number of Nepali language speakers is 106,399, constituting 1.1% of the total population of the state.

West Bengal
As per the 2001 Census, there are a total of 1,034,038 ethnic Gorkhas in West Bengal, of which 1,022,725 are speakers of the Nepali language and 11,313 are speakers of languages such as Tamang and Sherpa. The population in the Darjeeling and Kalimpong districts are 748,023 (46.48% of the total population) and Jalpaiguri – 234,500 (6.99%). Most of the ethnic Nepali population in West Bengal live in the Gorkhaland Territorial Administration region. About 7.56% of the Nepalis were Dalit, belonging to castes such as Kami and Sarki (population of 78,202 in 2001). The two tribes classified as Scheduled Tribe (Limbu and Tamang) constituted 16% of the Nepali population according to the census. The remaining 76% belonged to general category.

As per the 2011 Census, there were a total of 1,161,807 speakers of various Nepalese languages. Out of this 7.24% was Dalit (84,110) and 16.62% (193,050) were tribal Tamang/Limbu. Remaining 76.14% were General category.

Forced displacement
Nepali-speaking people in the states of Northeast India have faced violence and ethnic cleansing. In 1967, more than 8,000 Nepali-speaking people were driven out of Mizoram, while more than 2,000 in Manipur met with the same fate in 1980. Tens of thousands of Nepali-speaking people were banished from Assam (in 1979) and Meghalaya (in 1987) by militant groups. 

The biggest displacement occurred in Meghalaya, when the Khasi Students Union (KSU) targeted Nepali speakers living in the eastern part of the state. More than 15,000 Nepali speakers were driven out, while about 10,000 were reduced to living in subhuman life in the refugee camps of Shillong. Gorkha labourers in the coal mines in Jowai were targeted, and as a result of their murders dozens of Gorkha children starved to death in the next few weeks. In 2010, there were riots between Khasis and Gorkhas, which left several Gorkhas dead. One elderly Gorkha man was burnt alive.

In 1980s, most of the Gorkha in Nagaland were forced to forfeit their land, and 200 of them were murdered near Merapani in Wokha district.

Politics

The Gorkhaland movement is a campaign to create a separate state of India in the Gorkhaland region of West Bengal for the Nepali speaking Indians. The proposed state includes the hill regions of the Darjeeling district, Kalimpong district and Dooars regions that include Jalpaiguri, Alipurduar and parts of Coochbehar districts. A demand for a separate administrative unit in Darjeeling has existed since 1909, when the Hillmen's Association of Darjeeling submitted a memorandum to Minto-Morley Reforms demanding a separate administrative setup.

Darjeeling Gorkha Hill Council

Darjeeling Gorkha Hill Council (DGHC) (1988–2012), also once known for a short period of time as Darjeeling Gorkha Autonomous Hill Council was a semi-autonomous body that looked after the administration of the hills of Darjeeling District in the state of West Bengal, India. DGHC had three subdivisions under its authority: Darjeeling, Kalimpong, and Kurseong and some areas of Siliguri subdivision.

Led by Subhash Ghisingh, Gorkhas raised the demand for the creation of a state called Gorkhaland within India to be carved out of the hills of Darjeeling and areas of Dooars and Siliguri terai contiguous to Darjeeling. A violent agitation erupted in the Darjeeling hills from 1986 to 1988 in which 1200 people lost their lives.

The semi-autonomous Darjeeling Gorkha Hill Council was the result of the signing of the Darjeeling Gorkha Hill Council Agreement between the Central Government of India, the West Bengal Government and the Gorkha National Liberation Front in Kolkata on 22 August 1988.

Gorkhaland Territorial Administration

The DGHC did not fulfill its goal of forming a new state, which led to the downfall of Subhash Ghisingh and the rise of another party Gorkha Janmukti Morcha (GJM) headed by Bimal Gurung in 2007, which launched a second agitation for a Gorkhaland state.
After three years of agitation for a state of Gorkhaland led by GJM, the GJM reached an agreement with the state government to form a semi-autonomous body to administer the Darjeeling hills.
The Memorandum of Agreement for Gorkhaland Territorial Administration(GTA) was signed on 18 July 2011 at Pintail Village near Siliguri in the presence of Union Home Minister P. Chidambaram, West Bengal chief minister Mamata Banerjee, the then Darjeeling Lok Sabha MP Jaswant Singh and Gorkha Janmukti Morcha leaders. The agreement was signed by West Bengal Home Secretary G.D. Gautama, Union Home Ministry Joint Secretary K.K. Pathak and Gorkha Janmukti Morcha general secretary Roshan Giri.

Notable persons

Actors

 Ganesh – Kannada film actor
 Bharti Singh – Comedian
 Bhumika Gurung – Television actress and model
 Geetanjali Thapa – Bollywood actress (National Film Award for Best Actress recipient 2013)
 Mala Sinha – Indian actress in Hindi and Bengali cinemas
 Niruta Singh – Actress in Nepali cinema
 Pratibha Sinha – Bollywood Indian actress (daughter of actress Mala Sinha and Nepali actor C.P. Lohani)
 Rewati Chetri – Model and actress

Cinematographers

Binod Pradhan

Military

 Major Durga Malla – Indian freedom fighter
 Captain Ram Singh Thakuri – Indian freedom fighter who composed a number of patriotic songs including Kadam Kadam Badaye Ja 
 Lieutenant-Colonel Dhan Singh Thapa – Param Vir Chakra recipient
 Brigadier Sher Jung Thapa (Hero of Skardu) – Mahavir Chakra recipient for his actions in the Indo-Pakistani War of 1947
 Trilochan Pokhrel – Indian freedom fighter
 Colonel Lalit Rai – Vir Chakra recipient for his actions in the Kargil War in 1999.
 Subedar Major Ganju Lama – Victoria cross recipient

Musicians

 Louis Banks – Jazz musician
 Bipul Chettri – Singer, composer
 Ranjit Gazmer – Bollywood film musician
 Sukmit Gurung – Singer
 Aruna Lama – Nepali Singer from Darjeeling
 Udit Narayan – Playback singer
 Adrian Pradhan – Singer, songwriter, guitarist. Former 1974 AD member of Nepal
 Sonam Sherpa – Lead Guitarist of Parikrama band
 Poornima Shrestha – Bollywood playback singer
 Phiroj Shyangden – Singer, songwriter, guitarist. Former founding member of 1974 AD band of Nepal 
 Prashant Tamang – Singer, actor, winner of Indian Idol Season 3
 Shanti Thatal – Composer, singer, producer
 Hira Devi Waiba – Pioneer of Nepali folk songs, singer
 Navneet Aditya Waiba – Folk singer
 Gopal Yonzon – Singer, musician, playwright
 Karma Yonzon – Composer, singer, producer

Sports

Athletics 

 Basanta Bahadur Rana – Racewalker

Archery

 Tarundeep Rai – Archer, Asian Games 2011 silver medalist, Arjuna Award recipient 2005, Padma Shri recipient 2020

Boxing

 Birender Singh Thapa – Boxer
 Shiva Thapa – Boxer (youngest Indian boxer to qualify for the Olympic Games)

Cricket

 Jay Bista – Cricketer
 Gokul Sharma – Captain of Assam cricket team
 Abhishek Thakuri – Cricketer
 Ruben Lepcha – Cricketer

Football

 Ajay Chhetri – Footballer
 Amar Bahadur Gurung – footballer
 Anirudh Thapa- footballer
 Anju Tamang – women's footballer
 Ashish Chettri – footballer
 Bijendra Rai – footballer
 Bikash Jairu – footballer
 Chandan Singh Rawat – footballer
 Israil Gurung – footballer
 Kamal Thapa – footballer
 Komal Thatal – footballer
 Lalit Thapa – goalkeeper
 Mobin Rai – footballer
 Nagen Tamang – footballer
 Narender Thapa – footballer
 Nim Dorjee Tamang – footballer
 Nima Tamang – footballer
 Nirmal Chettri – footballer
 Pinky Bompal Magar – women's footballer
 Puran Bahadur Thapa – footballer
 Ram Bahadur Chettri – footballer
 Robin Gurung – footballer
 Sanju Pradhan – footballer, Mumbai City FC
 Shyam Thapa – footballer
 Sunil Chhetri – captain of the India national football team and Bengaluru FC. Recipient of Arjuna Award (2011) and Padma Shri (2019)
 Uttam Rai – footballer
 Vinit Rai – footballer

Hockey

 Bharat Chettri – Hockey player (former captain of Indian hockey team)
 Bir Bahadur Chettri – Hockey player
 Chaman Singh Gurung – Hockey player

Shooting

 Jitu Rai – Shooter, recipient of Arjuna Award(2015), Khel Ratna(2016) and Padma Shri(2020).
 Pemba Tamang – Shooter

Writers

 Indra Bahadur Rai – Nepali writer and literary critic from Darjeeling, India.
 Hari Prasad Gorkha Rai
 Kedar Gurung
 Kumar Pradhan
 Lil Bahadur Chettri – Padma Shri award recipient (2020) for his contribution towards Nepali literature.
 Prajwal Parajuly – English language writer and novelist
 Ganga Prasad Pradhan – Translator of the Nepali Bible, co-author of an English-Nepali dictionary, author of children's textbooks.
 Parijat real name Bishnu Kumari Waiba – Original writer of The Blue Mimosa Birthplace Darjeeling
 Agam Singh Giri – Nepali language poet and lyricist from Darjeeling.
 Birkha Bahadur Muringla -Padma Shri award recipient.
 Tulsiram Sharma Kashyap

Politicians

 Chobilal Upadhyaya – first president of the Assam Pradesh Congress Committee
 Shanta Chhetri – Member of Parliament 
 B. B. Gurung – third Chief Minister of Sikkim.
 Bimal Gurung – Leader of Gorkha Janmukti Morcha (GJM)
 Bishal Lama – MLA from Kalchini
 Bhaskar Sharma – MLA from Margherita, Assam 
 Damber Singh Gurung – Indian Gorkha representative in the Constituent Assembly of India
 Dawa Narbula – Member of the Indian National Congress (INC), former Member of Parliament
 Ganesh Kumar Limbu – MLA from Barchalla, Assam
 Madan Tamang –Former President of Akhil Bharatiya Gorkha League (ABGL)
 Moni Kumar Subba – Member of INC , Assam
 Nar Bahadur Bhandari – Former Chief Minister of Sikkim
 Ram Prasad Sharma – MP of Tezpur
 Pawan Kumar Chamling – 5th Chief Minister of Sikkim, founder and president of Sikkim Democratic Front and the longest serving chief minister in India.
 Prem Singh Tamang – Current Chief Minister of Sikkim, founder of Sikkim Krantikari Morcha.
 Prasanta Pradhan – CPI(M) Leader
 Prem Das Rai – Former Member of Parliament
 Subhash Ghisingh – Founder of Gorkhaland Movement in India and founder of political party GNLF
 Raju Bista – Member of Parliament from Darjeeling Lok Sabha constituency, 2019
 Dil Kumari Bhandari – former and first women member of parliament from Sikkim. Wife of former Chief Minister of Sikkim Narbahadur Bhandari. Birthplace Darjeeling
 Neeraj Zimba – MLA from Darjeeling and top leader of Gorkha National Liberation Front.
 Indra Hang Subba – Member of Parliament from Sikkim, elected in 2019.
 Ruden Sada Lepcha – MLA from Kalimpong

Others

 Balkrishna : Indian billionaire of Nepali origin
 Draupadi Ghimiray – Social activist, Padma Shri award recipient.
 Tulsi Ghimire – Film director/producer
 Mahendra P. Lama – Founding vice-chancellor of Sikkim University
 Nitesh R Pradhan – Journalist and singer
 Pratima Puri – First news reader of Doordarshan
 Rangu Souriya – Social worker

See also
 India–Nepal relations
 Gorkhaland
 Gurkha
 Nepalis
 Gorkha Kingdom
 Kirata Kingdom

References

 

 
Gorkhaland
Ethnic groups in India

Nepali language
Nepalese diaspora in Asia
Nepalese diaspora by country